Darko Lazić may refer to:

 Darko Lazić (singer), Serbian singer
 Darko Lazić (footballer), Serbian footballer